Joseph E. Plummer is an American drummer from Portland, Oregon. From 2004 to 2012 Plummer was a percussionist and drummer for the indie rock band Modest Mouse and performed on their album, We Were Dead Before the Ship Even Sank.

Before joining Modest Mouse, Plummer played with the indie rock bands The Black Heart Procession and The Magic Magicians. Plummer was one of the 88 drummers who participated in Japanese noise rock pioneers Boredoms 88 Boadrum performance on August 8, 2008.

In May  2009, Plummer replaced Jesse Sandoval as the drummer for The Shins.  He is also a member of Mister Heavenly, a collaboration with Honus Honus of Man Man and Nicholas Thorburn of Islands and The Unicorns, experimenting with a new genre entitled "doom wop."
 
Plummer also works as a freelance composer. He contributed music for the episodic comedy Antarctic...huh?, directed by Matt Hoyt with art direction and design by Jason Sherry. An early version premiered at the Museum of Contemporary Art San Diego - La Jolla in the summer of 2010.

On November 10, 2013, the Orange County Register announced that Matt Aveiro of Cold War Kids had left the band, and that Plummer would be holding his place indefinitely.

On July 15, 2014, the Cold War Kids released the first single, "All This Could Be Yours" from their fifth album Hold My Home. The release of Hold My Home had Plummer and multi-instrumentalist/singer Matthew Schwartz being credited as proper members of Cold War Kids on the album's liner notes as opposed to touring members as previously credited.

On August 7, 2015, Joe's "Built in Sun" EP project with Pall Jenkins and Richard Swift was released.

Plummer recently announced a new record with Matt from Cold War Kids and Daniel from Tijuana Panthers - The Coromandelles.

Plummer is mentioned in Thank You for Coming to Hattiesburg: One Comedian's Tour of Not-Quite-the-Biggest Cities in the World" by Todd Barry. He is also mentioned in "Set the Boy Free: The Autobiography" by Johnny Marr.

Plummer has appeared as a musical guest on Saturday Night Live, The Late Show with David Letterman, and Jimmy Kimmel Live!.

References

External links 

 joeplummermusic.com/

American percussionists
Living people
Year of birth missing (living people)
The Shins members
Modest Mouse members
Mister Heavenly members
Musicians from Portland, Oregon
People from Pleasanton, California